The Transformatorenhäuschen  (literally ‘little transformer house’) is a former electrical distribution substation on the Sindersfelder Straße in Anzefahr, a borough of the Hessian city of Kirchhain in Marburg-Biedenkopf district.

The tower-like building was erected during the first quarter of the 20th century and connected Anzefahr to the power grid. Both the corners and window cutouts feature sandstone.

Literature 
 Helmuth K. Stoffers: . Published by the Landesamt für Denkmalpflege Hessen. Konrad Theiss Verlag, 2002. , S. 249.

Buildings and structures in Marburg-Biedenkopf
Culture of Hesse
Towers completed in the 20th century
Towers in Germany
Former power stations in Germany